Mount Olivet is the name of several unincorporated communities in the U.S. state of West Virginia:

Mount Olivet, Marshall County, West Virginia
Mount Olivet, Preston County, West Virginia